Aristotelia staticella is a moth of the family Gelechiidae. It is found in France, Portugal and Ukraine, as well as on Sardinia.

References

Moths described in 1876
Aristotelia (moth)
Moths of Europe
Taxa named by Pierre Millière